Paul Georg Jyrkänkallio (until 1944 Schmidt; 25 May 1922 - 2 May 2004) was a Finnish diplomat.

Jyrkänkallio was born in Koivisto, and obtained a Bachelor of Philosophy degree. He was an ambassador in Sofia from 1969 to 1972, Budapest from 1973 to 1977, then Secretary of State for Foreign Affairs in 1977-1980 and again Ambassador to Rome in 1980  -1985 and Athens 1985-1992. He died in Helsinki, aged 81.

References 

Ambassadors of Finland to Bulgaria
Ambassadors of Finland to Italy
Ambassadors of Finland to Hungary
Ambassadors of Finland to Greece
1922 births
2004 deaths
People from Vyborg District